Illumina may refer to:

 Illumina (Alisha's Attic album), an album by Alisha's Attic
 Illumina, Inc., a biotechnology company based in San Diego, California, United States
 Illumina (Two Steps from Hell album), an album by Two Steps from Hell